Cowpens Depot, also known as Cowpens Depot Museum and Civic Center, is a historic train station located at Cowpens, Spartanburg County, South Carolina. It was built in 1896 by the Southern Railway.  It is a one-story, rectangular frame building painted gray, with a gable roof and freight loading platform. The depot closed in 1967.

In 1982 the Town of Cowpens moved it from railroad property one block to its present location. The town has an historic railroad car on display by the depot. The depot was listed on the National Register of Historic Places in 1997.

References

External links
 Cowpens Depot & Museum - Town of Cowpens

Railway stations on the National Register of Historic Places in South Carolina
Railway stations in the United States opened in 1896
National Register of Historic Places in Spartanburg County, South Carolina
Museums in Spartanburg County, South Carolina
History museums in South Carolina
Stations along Southern Railway lines in the United States
Former railway stations in South Carolina